Nova Sela is a village between Metković and Vrgorac in the Kula Norinska municipality.

History 
The locality contains stećci from the 15th century. Emigrants from Herzegovina lead by serdar Mate Bebić settled in Nova Sela after the Ottomans lost the village. Italian soldiers burnt down the original parish church in 1943 during World War II. After the conflict, Nova Sela was in the Borovci parish. A renovated building served as the church of the undivided parish. Today's Nova Sela parish was established on 26 September 1957.

Architecture

Church of Saint Anthony 
The church is located in the nearby Kulina. A chapel used to be there since at least 1774, when a marriage is recorded. It was tore down in 1830 and today's church was built. Its dimensions are 15x6 metres. The apse is squared and there's a sixteen-pointed rosette on the front. The belfry has three bells. A new altar was placed in 1965 when the bishop was Veselko Leutić. Thorough renewals happened in 1988 when the bishop was Dušan Brečić. A concrete platform was also built with a balcony for the bells. During the time of bishop Dušan Brečić in the late 1990s, it was removed because it had been considered unpleasant. A new roof was built in September 2003 during the time of bishop Ljubo Pavić, and the belfry was repaired.

Demographics

References

External links 

Populated places in Dubrovnik-Neretva County